The 1986 Wimbledon Championships was a tennis tournament played on grass courts at the All England Lawn Tennis and Croquet Club in Wimbledon, London in the United Kingdom. It was the 100th edition of the Wimbledon Championships and were held from 23 June to 6 July 1986.

For the first time yellow balls were used during the tournament. In recognition of the 100th championship, the two oldest living singles champions were invited to present the singles championship trophies: Jean Borotra presented the gentlemen's singles and Kitty Godfree presented the ladies', both alongside the President of the All England Club Prince Edward, Duke of Kent and his wife.

Prize money
The total prize money for 1986 championships was £2,119,780. The winner of the men's title earned £140,000 while the women's singles champion earned £126,000.

* per team

Champions

Seniors

Men's singles

 Boris Becker defeated  Ivan Lendl, 6–4, 6–3, 7–5
 It was Becker's 2nd career Grand Slam title and his 2nd consecutive Wimbledon title.

Women's singles

 Martina Navratilova defeated  Hana Mandlíková, 7–6(7–1), 6–3
 It was Navratilova's 39th career Grand Slam title and her 7th Wimbledon single's title.

Men's doubles

 Joakim Nyström /  Mats Wilander defeated  Gary Donnelly /  Peter Fleming, 7–6(7–4), 6–3, 6–3
 It was Nyström's only career Grand Slam title. It was Wilander's 5th career Grand Slam title and his only Wimbledon title.

Women's doubles

 Martina Navratilova /  Pam Shriver defeated  Hana Mandlíková /  Wendy Turnbull, 6–1, 6–3
 It was Navratilova's 40th career Grand Slam title and her 15th Wimbledon title. It was Shriver's 14th career Grand Slam title and her 5th Wimbledon title.

Mixed doubles

 Ken Flach /  Kathy Jordan defeated  Heinz Günthardt /  Martina Navratilova, 6–3, 7–6(9–7)
 It was Flach's 3rd career Grand Slam title and his 1st Wimbledon title. It was Jordan's 7th and last career Grand Slam title and her 3rd Wimbledon title.

Juniors

Boys' singles

 Eduardo Vélez defeated  Javier Sánchez, 6–3, 7–5

Girls' singles

 Natasha Zvereva defeated  Leila Meskhi, 2–6, 6–2, 9–7

Boys' doubles

 Tomás Carbonell /  Petr Korda defeated  Shane Barr /  Hubert Karrasch, 6–1, 6–1

Girls' doubles

 Michelle Jaggard /  Lisa O'Neill defeated  Leila Meskhi /  Natasha Zvereva, 7–6(7–3), 6–7(4–7), 6–4

Singles seeds

Men's singles
  Ivan Lendl (final, lost to Boris Becker)
  Mats Wilander (fourth round, lost to Pat Cash)
  Jimmy Connors (first round, lost to Robert Seguso)
  Boris Becker (champion)
  Stefan Edberg (third round, lost to Miloslav Mečíř)
  Joakim Nyström (third round, lost to Ramesh Krishnan)
  Henri Leconte (semifinals, lost to Boris Becker)
  Anders Järryd (second round, lost to Eddie Edwards)
  Andrés Gómez (first round, lost to John Fitzgerald)
  Tim Mayotte (quarterfinals, lost to Ivan Lendl)
  Kevin Curren (first round, lost to Eric Jelen)
  Brad Gilbert (fourth round, lost to Miloslav Mečíř)
  Mikael Pernfors (fourth round, lost to Boris Becker)
  Martín Jaite (second round, lost to Ken Flach)
  Guillermo Vilas (first round, lost to Pat Cash)
  Johan Kriek (second round, lost to John Sadri)

Women's singles
  Martina Navratilova (champion)
  Chris Evert Lloyd (semifinals, lost to Hana Mandlíková)
  Hana Mandlíková (final, lost to Martina Navratilova)
  Claudia Kohde-Kilsch (third round, lost to Raffaella Reggi)
  Pam Shriver (first round, lost to Betsy Nagelsen)
  Kathy Rinaldi (first round, lost to Nathalie Herreman)
  Helena Suková (quarterfinals, lost to Chris Evert Lloyd)
  Manuela Maleeva (fourth round, lost to Bettina Bunge)
  Zina Garrison (second round, lost to Anne Hobbs)
  Gabriela Sabatini (semifinals, lost to Martina Navratilova)
  Carling Bassett (fourth round, lost to Hana Mandlíková)
  Stephanie Rehe (first round, lost to Larisa Savchenko)
  Barbara Potter (withdrew before the tournament began)
  Wendy Turnbull (first round, lost to Jenny Byrne)
  Catarina Lindqvist (quarterfinals, lost to Gabriela Sabatini)
  Kathy Jordan (fourth round, lost to Chris Evert Lloyd)

References

External links
 Official Wimbledon Championships website

 
Wimbledon Championships
Wimbledon Championships
June 1986 sports events in the United Kingdom
July 1986 sports events in the United Kingdom